HeLa (also Hela or hela) is an immortalized cell line used in scientific research. It is the oldest and most commonly used human cell line. The line is derived from cervical cancer cells taken on February 8, 1951, from Henrietta Lacks, a 31-year-old African-American mother of five, who died of cancer on October 4, 1951, and after whom they are named. The cell line was found to be remarkably durable and prolific, which allows it to be used extensively in scientific study.

The cells from Lacks's cancerous cervical tumor were taken without her knowledge, which was common practice in the United States at the time. Cell biologist George Otto Gey found that they could be kept alive, and developed a cell line. Previously, cells cultured from other human cells would only survive for a few days. Cells from Lacks's tumor behaved differently.

History

Origin
In 1951, a patient named Henrietta Lacks was admitted to the Johns Hopkins Hospital with symptoms of irregular vaginal bleeding, and was subsequently treated for cervical cancer. Her first treatment was performed by Lawrence Wharton Jr., who at this time collected tissue samples from her cervix without her consent. Her cervical biopsy supplied samples of tissue for clinical evaluation and research by George Otto Gey, head of the Tissue Culture Laboratory, as was done with other surgical procedures. Gey's lab assistant Mary Kubicek used the roller-tube technique to place the cells into culture. It was observed that the cells grew robustly, doubling every 20–24 hours unlike previous specimens that died out.

The cells were propagated by Gey shortly before Lacks died of her cancer in 1951. This was the first human cell line to prove successful in vitro, which was a scientific achievement with profound future benefit to medical research. Gey freely donated these cells along with the tools and processes that his lab developed to any scientist requesting them simply for the benefit of science. Neither Lacks nor her family gave permission to harvest the cells but, at that time, permission was neither required nor customarily sought. The cells were later commercialized, although never patented in their original form. There was no requirement at that time to inform patients or their relatives about such matters because discarded material or material obtained during surgery, diagnosis, or therapy was the property of the physician or the medical institution.

As was custom for Gey's lab assistant, the culture was named after the first two letters of Henrietta Lacks's first and last name. Before a leak to the public in the 1970s which revealed her true name, the "HeLa" cell line was mistakenly believed to have been named after a "Helen Lane" or "Helen Larson".

Other cell cultures were being invaded by suspected HeLa cells, so one research group contacted the Lacks family seeking DNA samples to help identify contaminating cell lines. The family never understood the purpose of the visit, but they were distressed by their understanding of what the researchers told them. These cells are treated as cancer cells, as they are descended from a biopsy taken from a visible lesion on the cervix as part of Lacks's diagnosis of cancer.

HeLa cells, like other cell lines, are termed "immortal" in that they can divide an unlimited number of times in a laboratory cell culture plate as long as fundamental cell survival conditions are met (i.e. being maintained and sustained in a suitable environment). There are many strains of HeLa cells as they continue to mutate in cell cultures, but all HeLa cells are descended from the same tumor cells removed from Lacks. The total number of HeLa cells that have been propagated in cell culture far exceeds the total number of cells that were in Henrietta Lacks's body.

Controversy

Lacks's case is one of many examples of the lack of informed consent in 20th century medicine. Communication between tissue donors and doctors was virtually nonexistent (i.e. cells were taken without patient consent, nor were they told what the cells would be used for). Johns Hopkins Hospital, where Lacks received treatment and had her tissue harvested, was the only hospital in the Baltimore area where African American patients could receive free care. The patients receiving free care from this segregated sect of the hospital often became research subjects without their knowledge. Lacks's family also had no access to her patient files and had no say in who received HeLa cells or what they would be used for. Additionally, as HeLa cells were popularized and used more frequently throughout the scientific community, Lacks's relatives received no financial benefit and continued to live with limited access to healthcare.

This issue of who owns tissue samples taken for research was brought up in the Supreme Court of California case of Moore v. Regents of the University of California. The court ruled that a person's discarded tissue and cells are not his or her property and can be commercialized.

Lacks's case influenced the establishment of the Common Rule in 1981. The Common Rule enforces informed consent by ensuring that doctors inform patients if they plan to use any details of the patient's case in research and give them the choice of disclosing the details or not. Tissues connected to their donors' names are also strictly regulated under this rule, and samples are no longer named using donor initials, but rather by code numbers. To further resolve the issue of patient privacy, Johns Hopkins established a joint committee with the NIH and several of Lacks's family members to determine who receives access to Henrietta Lacks's genome.

In 2021 Henrietta Lacks's estate sued to get past and future payments for the alleged unauthorized and widely known sale of HeLa cells by Thermo Fisher Scientific. Lacks's family hired an attorney to seek compensation from upwards of 100 pharmaceutical companies that have used and profited from HeLa cells.

Use in research
HeLa cells were the first human cells to be successfully cloned in 1953 by Theodore Puck and Philip I. Marcus at the University of Colorado, Denver. Since that time, HeLa cells have "continually been used for research into cancer, AIDS, the effects of radiation and toxic substances, gene mapping, and countless other scientific pursuits." According to author Rebecca Skloot, by 2009, "more than 60,000 scientific articles had been published about research done on HeLa, and that number was increasing steadily at a rate of more than 300 papers each month."

Polio eradication 
HeLa cells were used by Jonas Salk to test the first polio vaccine in the 1950s. They were observed to be easily infected by poliomyelitis, causing infected cells to die. This made HeLa cells highly desirable for polio vaccine testing since results could be easily obtained. A large volume of HeLa cells were needed for the testing of Salk's polio vaccine, prompting the National Foundation for Infantile Paralysis (NFIP) to find a facility capable of mass-producing HeLa cells. In the spring of 1953, a cell culture factory was established at Tuskegee University to supply Salk and other labs with HeLa cells. Less than a year later, Salk's vaccine was ready for human trials.

Virology 
HeLa cells have been used in testing how parvovirus infects cells of humans, dogs, and cats. These cells have also been used to study viruses such as the oropouche virus (OROV). OROV causes the disruption of cells in culture, where cells begin to degenerate shortly after they are infected, causing viral induction of apoptosis. HeLa cells have been used to study the expression of the papillomavirus E2 and apoptosis. HeLa cells have also been used to study canine distemper virus' ability to induce apoptosis in cancer cell lines, which could play an important role in developing treatments for tumor cells resistant to radiation and chemotherapy.

HeLa cells have also been instrumental in the development of human papilloma virus (HPV) vaccines. In the 1980s, Harald zur Hausen found that Lacks's cells from the original biopsy contained HPV-18, which was later found to be the cause of the aggressive cancer that killed Henrietta Lacks. His work in linking HPV with cervical cancer won him a Nobel Prize and led to the development of HPV vaccines that are predicted to reduce the number of deaths from cervical cancer by 70%.

Over the years, HeLa cells have been infected with various types of viruses including HIV, Zika, herpes, and mumps to test and develop new vaccines and drugs. Dr. Richard Axel discovered that by adding the CD4 protein to HeLa cells, they were able to be infected with HIV, allowing the virus to be studied. In 1979, scientists learned that the measles virus constantly mutates when it infects HeLa cells and in 2019, found that Zika cannot multiply in HeLa cells.

Cancer 
HeLa cells have been used in a number of cancer studies, including those involving sex steroid hormones such as estradiol, estrogen, and estrogen receptors, along with estrogen-like compounds such as quercetin and its cancer-reducing properties. There have also been studies on HeLa cells, the effects of flavonoids and antioxidants with estradiol on cancer cell proliferation.

In 2011, HeLa cells were used in tests of novel heptamethine dyes IR-808 and other analogs which are currently being explored for their unique uses in medical diagnostics, the development of theranostics, the individualized treatment of cancer patients with the aid of PDT, co-administration with other drugs, and irradiation. HeLa cells have been used in research involving fullerenes to induce apoptosis as a part of photodynamic therapy, as well as in in vitro cancer research using cell lines. Further HeLa cells have also been used to define cancer markers in RNA, and have been used to establish an RNAi Based Identification System and Interference of Specific Cancer Cells.

HeLa was shown in 2014 to be a viable cell line for tumor xenografts in C57BL/6 nude mice, and was subsequently used to examine the in vivo effects of fluoxetine and cisplatin on cervical cancer.

Genetics 
In 1953, a lab mistake involving mixing HeLa cells with the wrong liquid allowed researchers to see and count each chromosome clearly in the HeLa cells they were working with for the first time. The accidental discovery led scientists Joe Hin Tjio and Albert Levan to develop better techniques for staining and counting chromosomes. They were the first to accurately describe that humans have 23 pairs of chromosomes rather than 24, as was previously believed. This was important for the study of developmental disorders such as Down syndrome that involved the number of chromosomes.

In 1965, Henry Harris and John Watkins created the first human-animal hybrid by fusing HeLa cells with mouse embryo cells. This enabled advancements in mapping genes to specific chromosomes, which would eventually lead to the Human Genome Project.

Space microbiology 
In the 1960s, HeLa cells were sent on the Soviet satellite Sputnik-6 and human space missions to determine the long term effects of space travel on living cells and tissue. Scientists discovered that HeLa cells divided even more quickly in zero gravity.

Analysis

Telomerase
The HeLa cell line was derived for use in cancer research. These cells proliferate abnormally rapidly, even compared to other cancer cells. Like many other cancer cells, HeLa cells have an active version of telomerase during cell division, which copies telomeres over and over again. This prevents the incremental shortening of telomeres that is implicated in aging and eventual cell death. In this way, the cells circumvent the Hayflick limit, which is the limited number of cell divisions that most normal cells can undergo before becoming senescent. The result is unlimited cell division and immortality.

Chromosome number
Horizontal gene transfer from human papillomavirus 18 (HPV18) to human cervical cells created the HeLa genome, which is different from Henrietta Lacks's genome in various ways, including its number of chromosomes. HeLa cells are rapidly dividing cancer cells, and the number of chromosomes varied during cancer formation and cell culture. The current estimate (excluding very tiny fragments) is a "hypertriploid chromosome number (3n+)" which means 76 to 80 total chromosomes (rather than the normal diploid number of 46) with 22–25 clonally abnormal chromosomes, known as "HeLa signature chromosomes". The signature chromosomes can be derived from multiple original chromosomes, making challenging summary counts based on original numbering. Researchers have also noted how stable these aberrant karyotypes can be. Studies that combined spectral karyotyping, FISH, and conventional cytogenic techniques revealed that the detected chromosomal aberrations may be representative of advanced cervical carcinomas and have likely been present in the primary tumor, since the HeLa genome has remained stable even after years of continued cultivation.

Complete genome sequence
The complete genome of the HeLa cells was sequenced and published on 11 March 2013 without the Lacks family's knowledge. Concerns were raised by the family, so the authors voluntarily withheld access to the sequence data. Jay Shendure led a HeLa sequencing project at the University of Washington which produced a paper that had been accepted for publication in March 2013 – but that was also put on hold while the Lacks family's privacy concerns were being addressed. On August 7, 2013, NIH director Francis Collins announced a policy of controlled access to the cell line genome based on an agreement reached after three meetings with the Lacks family. A data-access committee will review requests from researchers for access to the genome sequence under the criteria that the study is for medical research and the users will abide by terms in the HeLa Genome Data Use Agreement, which includes that all NIH-funded researchers will deposit the data into a single database for future sharing. The committee consists of six members including representatives from the medical, scientific, and bioethics fields, as well as two members of the Lacks family. In an interview, Collins praised the Lacks family's willingness to participate in this situation that was thrust upon them. He described the whole experience with them as "powerful", saying that it brought together "science, scientific history and ethical concerns" in a unique way.

Contamination
HeLa cells are sometimes difficult to control because of their adaptation to growth in tissue culture plates and ability to invade and outcompete other cell lines. Through improper maintenance, they have been known to contaminate other cell cultures in the same laboratory, interfering with biological research and forcing researchers to declare many results invalid. The degree of HeLa cell contamination among other cell types is unknown because few researchers test the identity or purity of already established cell lines. It has been demonstrated that a substantial fraction of in vitro cell lines are contaminated with HeLa cells; estimates range from 10% to 20%. This observation suggests that any cell line may be susceptible to a degree of contamination. Stanley Gartler (1967) and Walter Nelson-Rees (1975) were the first to publish on the contamination of various cell lines by HeLa. Gartler noted that "With the continued expansion of cell culture technology, it is almost certain that both interspecific and intraspecific contamination will occur."

HeLa cell contamination has become a pervasive worldwide problem – affecting even the laboratories of many notable physicians, scientists, and researchers, including Jonas Salk. The HeLa contamination problem also contributed to Cold War tensions. The USSR and the USA had begun to cooperate in the war on cancer launched by President Richard Nixon, only to find that the exchanged cells were contaminated by HeLa.

Rather than focus on how to resolve the problem of HeLa cell contamination, many scientists and science writers continue to document this problem as simply a contamination issue – caused not by human error or shortcomings but by the hardiness, proliferating, or overpowering nature of HeLa. Recent data suggest that cross-contaminations are still a major ongoing problem with modern cell cultures. The International Cell Line Authentication Committee (ICLAC) notes that many cases of cell line misidentification are the result of cross-contamination of the culture by another faster growing cell line. This calls into question the validity of the research done using the contaminated cell lines, as certain attributes of the contaminant, which may come from an entirely different species or tissue, may be misattributed to the cell line under investigation.

New species proposal
HeLa was described by evolutionary biologist Leigh Van Valen as an example of the contemporary creation of a new species, dubbed Helacyton gartleri, due to their ability to replicate indefinitely, and their non-human number of chromosomes. The species was named after geneticist Stanley M. Gartler, whom van Valen credits with discovering "the remarkable success of this species". His argument for speciation depends on these points:
The chromosomal incompatibility of HeLa cells with humans.
The ecological niche of HeLa cells.
Their ability to persist and expand well beyond the desires of human cultivators.
HeLa can be defined as a species as it has its own clonal karyotype.

Van Valen proposed the new family Helacytidae and the genus Helacyton, as well as proposing a new species for HeLa cells in the same paper.

However, this proposal has not been taken seriously by other prominent evolutionary biologists, nor by scientists in other disciplines. Van Valen's argument of HeLa being a new species does not fulfill the criteria for an independent unicellular asexually reproducing species because of the notorious instability of HeLa's karyotype and their lack of a strict ancestral-descendant lineage.

Gallery

In media

The 1997 documentary The Way of All Flesh by Adam Curtis explains the history of HeLa and its implications in medicine and society.

A 2010 episode of Law & Order "Immortal" was heavily based on the story of Henrietta Lacks and the HeLa line, using the fictional "NaRo" cells as a stand-in.

The story of how the HeLa line came to be was also the subject of a 2010 episode of the podcast Radiolab.

HeLa was the subject of a 2010 book by Rebecca Skloot, The Immortal Life of Henrietta Lacks, investigating the historical context of the cell line and how the Lacks family was involved in its use.
A 2017 HBO film, The Immortal Life of Henrietta Lacks was based on the book. The film stars Oprah Winfrey, Sylvia Grace Crim, Rocky Carroll and Renee Elise Goldsberry as Henrietta Lacks. Author Rebecca Skloot also appears as a character in the film, portrayed by Rose Byrne.

See also 
Clonally transmissible cancer
Moore v. Regents of the University of California, case that set precedent for discarded tissue
List of contaminated cell lines
WI-38

References

Further reading

External links 

 HeLa (CCL-2 Cells) in the ATCC database
 
HeLa Transfection and Selection Data for HeLa Cells
Rebecca Skloot, The Immortal Life of Henrietta Lacks book website with additional features (photo/video/audio)
The Henrietta Lacks Foundation, a foundation established to, among other things, help provide scholarship funds and health insurance to Henrietta Lacks's family.
Rebecca Skloot, Cells That Save Lives are a Mother's Legacy, New York Times
"Wonder Woman: The Life, Death, and Life After Death of Henrietta Lacks, Unwitting Heroine of Modern Medical Science" by Van Smith
"What's Left of Henrietta Lacks?" by Anne Enright
"Culturing Life: How Cells Became Technologies" a book by Hannah Landecker about HeLa and the history of tissue culture.
Discussion about the taxonomic effect of creating the new taxon Helacyton.
Cell Centered Database – HeLa cell
Audio Interview with Rebecca Skloot about her book "The Immortal Life of Henrietta Lacks"
Cellosaurus entry for HeLa
The Legacy of Henrietta Lacks

Human cell lines
Bioethics
Johns Hopkins Hospital
Cellular senescence
1951 in biotechnology